"Deanna" is a song by Nick Cave and the Bad Seeds. It is the second single from their 1988 album Tender Prey.

Inspiration
Biographer Ian Johnston claimed that Deanna was a woman Nick Cave had recently had a "passionate, intense relationship with". Cave later said the song is "seen as a particularly brutal act of betrayal, and thirty years on I still haven’t been fully forgiven. I console myself with the thought that I was unflinching in my duties as a songwriter, even though it broke a heart (or two) in the process."

"The Girl at the Bottom of My Glass" 
The B-side of "Deanna" is "The Girl at the Bottom of My Glass", recorded for but not released on Tender Prey. It remained unreleased on an album until 2005, with the release of B-Sides & Rarities.

Reception
AllMusic called the song, "a garage rock-style rave-up that lyrically is everything Natural Born Killers tried to be, but failed at -- killing sprees, Cadillacs, and carrying out the work of the Lord, however atypically".
Stereogum noted, "the irresistible, danceable sway of the organ and drumbeat distract - if only momentarily - from such lines as 'I cum a death’s head into your frock'".

The Quietus wrote, "The rousing garage pop of "Deanna" would quickly become one of Cave's best-known songs (it was almost 'radio friendly') and a live favourite. The track was based on a version of Edwin Hawkins' "Oh Happy Day". The lyrics were particularly memorable."

Charts

References

Nick Cave songs
1988 singles
Song recordings produced by Flood (producer)
Songs written by Nick Cave
Songs written by Mick Harvey
Mute Records singles
1988 songs